EnergyNest helps its customers to unlock value of underutilized energy: Their Thermal Battery stores high temperature heat, giving them a higher flexibility when interacting with and within the power grid. By balancing energy availability with actual demand, EnergyNest solves a big problem for industrial companies and power plants relying on thermal processes. This reduces the cost of energy, lowers dependence on  emitting fuels and creates new revenue generation opportunities. Maximizing the value of energy is EnergyNest's solution for attractive economic returns, decarbonization where it really matters and an effective integration of renewable energies. The energy conversion efficiency is 40%.

References

External links
Official website

Companies established in 2011
Privately held companies of Norway